The Vice of Gambling is a 1923 German silent film directed by Dimitri Buchowetzki and starring Alfred Abel, Willy Kaiser-Heyl, and Theodor Loos.

The film's sets were designed by the art director Hans Dreier.

Cast
 Alfred Abel
 Willy Kaiser-Heyl
 Theodor Loos
 Sybill Morel

References

Bibliography

External links

1923 films
Films of the Weimar Republic
German silent feature films
Films directed by Dimitri Buchowetzki
German black-and-white films
Films about gambling
1920s German films